Skip Storch (born c. 1957) is an American swimmer.

On August 29, 2007, 50-year-old Storch swam a record-breaking 85.5 miles unassisted continuous triple lap swim around Manhattan Island, completing the swim in 32 hours and 52 minutes, breaking two recognized records and qualifying him for an ESPN ESPY Award. Storch did not stop swimming but did stop river boat traffic. He was nominated for an ESPN ESPY award, "Best Outdoor Sportsman", for this achievement in 2008. Storch lives and works in Nanuet, New York, at his own Tackle and Fly shop called SHU-Fly. He is the assistant swimming coach at Ramapo College in Mahwah, New Jersey, and trains at LifePlex pool in Monsey, New York.

In September 2017 Storch was charged with predatory sexual assault against a child. During their investigation, authorities said they learned Storch committed sexual acts with a child under 13 between June 2008 and December 2011. In February 2018 Storch pleaded guilty and on August 14, 2018, he was sentenced to 7 years in prison, with 15 years of probation, and will be on the New York State Sex Offender Registry.

Awards
ESPN ESPY Nomination "Best Outdoor Sportsman"
Skip Storch Day (Rockland County) May 5, 2009
International Marathon Swimming Hall of Fame 2009

References 

1950s births
Living people
American male swimmers
Place of birth missing (living people)
People from Nanuet, New York
American long-distance swimmers
Manhattan Island swimmers